Jillana (born 1934) is an American ballet dancer and instructor, and a former principal dancer with New York City Ballet.

Early life and education
Jillana was born Jill Zimmerman in Hackensack, New Jersey. She took lessons in tap and ballet dancing as a small child.
Jillana attended the School of American Ballet, beginning at age 11, after earning a scholarship. She trained there under George Balanchine. She was recruited by the New York City Ballet (then known as Ballet Society) one year later; when she was thirteen she made her first appearance with the company. At age 17, she was featured in Seventeen magazine, in the January 1952 issue.

Career
After six years of experience with the New York City Ballet company, she was promoted to principal dancer; she continued in this capacity for twenty years.  Balanchine created roles for her in many ballets, including Liebeslieder Walzer.

Jillana has danced with a number of partners, including Jacques d'Amboise, Arthur Mitchell, and Edward Villella. Jillana has also performed with other ballet companies including American Ballet Theatre and National Ballet of Washington, D.C. She has appeared on Broadway, in the musical Destry Rides Again, and in a number of television shows, including Noah and the Flood (with choreography by George Balanchine).

Jillana has worked as an instructor at The New York City Ballet, the School of American Ballet and Joffrey School, Paris Opera Ballet and Ballet West. She also taught at the University of California at Irvine and was the director of DanceAspen.

Jillana now runs her own summer dance program, The Jillana School. She sets ballets on companies worldwide for the George Balanchine Trust.

References

Living people
American ballerinas
School of American Ballet alumni
New York City Ballet principal dancers
1934 births
Dancers from New Jersey
People from Hackensack, New Jersey